Pouteria calistophylla is a species of plant in the family Sapotaceae. It is found in Costa Rica and Panama.

References

calistophylla
Vulnerable plants
Taxonomy articles created by Polbot
Taxa named by Charles Baehni
Taxa named by Paul Carpenter Standley